Salice Salentino is a small town and comune in the southern part of Apulia, Italy, in the Salento area.  It is bounded with the province of Taranto to the northwest and the province of Brindisi to the north.

Main sights include the Chiesa Madre ("Mother Church") of Santa Maria Assunta (16th century) and the convent of the Friars Minor (1597-1597). Its coat of arms features a tree in the middle of a shield and a golden crown on top.

History

Founded by the prince Raimondo Orsini Del Balzo in the end of the 14th century, Salice Salentino owes its name to the willow trees that once used to grow and populate its muddy, clay soil.  The prince constructed his residence, the "Casa del Re" (House of the King).   It was later owned by the baron Zurlo in 1485.  It was passed on to the marquis Albricci, Enriquez, prince of Squinzano, Filomarini, duke of Cutrofiano and della Torre.

Economy

Its main economical activity is agriculture in the olive and wine industry.

It is a center of production for  Salice Salentino wine.

References

External links
Official website

Cities and towns in Apulia
Localities of Salento